Alliance of Round, Traditional and Square-Dance, Inc. (ARTS-Dance) is an association to promote round, square, line, and other forms of traditional and folk dance.  It is a non-profit/charitable foundation under the U.S. Internal Revenue Service section 501 (c) (3) incorporated in North Carolina in 2003 with main address in San Diego, California. It used to be known as ARTS Alliance.

The association has multiple levels of membership.

The governing board members are the following organizations:
CALLERLAB, CONTRALAB, International Association of Gay Square Dance Clubs, National Square Dance Campers Association, National Executive Committee of the National Square Dance Convention, ROUNDALAB, Singles Square Dancers USA, Universal Round Dance Council, United Square Dancers of America, and the  Policy Board.

Associated membership is provided for dance-related organizations, "recreational leaders" and "supporters of the dance activities". 

Individual membership is also provided.

External links 
ARTS-Dance Home Page

Square dance
Dance organizations
Dance in the United States